Christopher Thomas James Chessun (born 5 August 1956) is a British Anglican bishop. Since 2011, he has been Bishop of Southwark in the Church of England.

Early life and education
Chessun is a twin and was born on 5 August 1956. He was educated at Hampton School, an all-boys private school in London. He studied modern history at University College, Oxford, graduating with a Bachelor of Arts (BA) degree in 1978: as per tradition, his BA was promoted to a Master of Arts (MA Oxon) degree in 1982. He trained for ordination at Westcott House, Cambridge, while also studying theology at Trinity Hall, Cambridge.

Ordained ministry
Made a deacon at Petertide 1983 (3 July) by Conrad Meyer, Bishop of Dorchester, at Dorchester Abbey and ordained a priest the following Petertide (1 July 1984) by Patrick Rodger, Bishop of Oxford, at Christ Church Cathedral, Oxford, he served curacies at St Michael and All Angels Sandhurst and St Mary's Portsea and was then successively a chaplain at St Paul's Cathedral, London, rector of St Dunstan's, Stepney, Archdeacon of Northolt (2001–2005).

Episcopal ministry
In 2005, he was appointed Bishop of Woolwich, an area bishop of the Diocese of Southwark. He was consecrated a bishop on 21 April 2005. He is a passionate advocate of overseas church links.

Having served as an area bishop for over five years, his appointment as Bishop of Southwark was confirmed before a congregation at St Mary-le-Bow, Cheapside on 17 January 2011. His enthronement at Southwark Cathedral took place on 6 March 2011.

In March 2011 he began public ministry as the 10th Bishop of Southwark.  He is a strong advocate for the parish system as the most effective means of church presence and engagement in the life of local communities, including the need to proclaim the Gospel afresh amid the rapid changes in church and community life. As Bishop of Southwark, his residence is Bishop's House, Streatham.

Chessun is also the lead Bishop for Urban Life and Faith for the Church of England. This offers him an opportunity to contribute to debates and discussions on the importance of the churches' contribution to urban and public policy within society. In 2012, a number of Evangelicals criticised him for the appointment of Liberal Catholics to his leadership team.

In May 2011, the Church of England declared that three members of the diocese participating in the Anglican Mission in England, ordained in Kenya, were in an impaired state of communion with Chessun due to a conflict of views on homosexuality. These "irregular" clergy would have to seek other bishops to ordain their candidates. His views are similar to those of his predecessor, Tom Butler, who appointed Chessun as Bishop of Woolwich.

Styles
The Reverend Christopher Chessun (1983–2001)
The Venerable Christopher Chessun (2001–2005)
The Right Reverend Christopher Chessun (2005–present)

References

1956 births
People educated at Hampton School
Alumni of University College, Oxford
20th-century English Anglican priests
Archdeacons of Northolt
21st-century Church of England bishops
Living people
Bishops of Southwark
Bishops of Woolwich
Lords Spiritual
Bishops for Urban Life and Faith
Alumni of Westcott House, Cambridge
Alumni of Trinity Hall, Cambridge